Menemerus formosus is a jumping spider species in the genus Menemerus that lives in Kenya. It was first described by Wanda Wesołowska in 1999. It is related to Menemerus bifurcus and Menemerus transvaalicus.

References

Endemic fauna of Kenya
Fauna of Kenya
Salticidae
Spiders of Africa
Spiders described in 1999
Taxa named by Wanda Wesołowska